Ranadhoj Thapa or Ranadhwaj Thapa was deputy Kaji to Mukhtiyar (Prime Minister) of Nepal Bhimsen Thapa.

Family and Life
He was the eldest son of Bada Kaji Amar Singh Thapa, supreme commander of Western front. He was great grandson of Ranjai [of Sirhanchowk] and grandson of Bhim Sen known as Umrao Bagh Bhim Singh Thapa, who died in the battle of Palanchowk in 1759 AD. His father was member of Bagale Thapa clan. He had 4 brothers; Bhaktabir Singh, Narsingh, Ramdas and Ranjore Singh, all of whom were Kaji at some point. He was functioning deputy to Mukhtiyar (Prime Minister) during the well known Anglo-Nepalese war. Mukhtiyar Bhimsen Thapa had to share administrative authority with him. Thus, his family was the another influential Bagale Thapa family serving in the royal court with Bhimsen Thapa family, due to their consolidation of power in the central authority. He retired as Kaji of Nepal in the year 1831 A.D. His two sons, Ripu Mardan Thapa and Badal Singh Thapa, also retired as Kaji of Nepal.

Gallery

References

Notes

Sources

Prime ministers of Nepal
Bagale Thapa